Silver age may refer to:

 Silver age, name often given to a particular period within a history, typically as a lesser and later successor to a golden age
 Silver Age of Comic Books, period of artistic advancement and commercial success in mainstream American comic books
 Silver Age of Russian Poetry, traditionally applied by Russian philologists to the first two decades of the 20th century
 Silver Age (DC Comics), a twelve part storyline that ran through a series of one shot comic books published by DC Comics in 2000
 Silver Age (album), a 2012 album by Bob Mould
 "Silver Age", a b-side to the Pet Shop Boys' 1999 single "I Don't Know What You Want but I Can't Give It Any More"

See also  

 Bronze Age (disambiguation)
 Golden Age (disambiguation)